Herbert Fisk Johnson III (born May 19, 1958), known as Fisk, is an American billionaire businessman. He is the fifth generation of his family to lead S. C. Johnson & Son, Inc of Racine, Wisconsin, as chairman and CEO. As of March 2022, his net worth was estimated at US$3.4 billion.

Early life
He is the son of the late Samuel Curtis Johnson Jr. (1928–2004) and Imogene Powers Johnson, and the great-great-grandson of company founder Samuel Curtis Johnson. His three siblings and mother each have a net worth of $3 billion as of May 2015.

Education
He has a BA in chemistry and physics, 1979; Master of Engineering, 1980; MS in applied physics, 1982; MBA in marketing and finance, 1984; and PhD in applied physics, 1986 – all from Cornell University and Cornell's S.C. Johnson Graduate School of Management.

Career
He joined the family business in 1987 as a marketing associate and served in a number of roles.  He was appointed chairman in 2000, and CEO in 2004.

On behalf of the company, he accepted a 2006 Ron Brown Award, a presidential award for corporate leadership.

Public policy work
He has served as a: 
 member of President's Advisory Committee for Trade Policy and Negotiation
 member of the World Business Council for Sustainable Development
 director on the board of Conservation International
 member of the executive board of CI's Center for Environmental Leadership in business
 trustee emeritus of Cornell University

Patents
He is one of the inventors listed on U.S. Patent #7028405, entitled "Vibratory Shaver", and U.S. patent application #20060238136, entitled "Lamp and bulb for illumination and ambiance lighting".

Charity
His extended family is the named benefactor of the Samuel Curtis Johnson Graduate School of Management at Cornell University.  He has supported Chicago's Shedd Aquarium. On 28 January 2017, he and the SC Johnson company donated $150 million to Cornell to name the SC Johnson College of Business, which comprises the previously-endowed Samuel Curtis Johnson Graduate School of Management, the Charles H. Dyson School of Applied Economics, and the School of Hotel Administration.

Personal life
Johnson was married to Dr. Susan Lochhead, a former emergency room physician, for 13 months. Johnson and Lochhead have a daughter. Their divorce proceeding went for three years. He lives in Racine, Wisconsin.

References 

1958 births
Living people
American billionaires
Businesspeople from Racine, Wisconsin
American chief executives of manufacturing companies
Samuel Curtis Johnson Graduate School of Management alumni
Samuel Curtis Johnson family
Cornell University College of Engineering alumni
21st-century American inventors
20th-century American businesspeople